The anthem of the Aragua State, Venezuela, has lyrics composed by Ramón Bastidas, with music made by Manuel Betancourt.

Lyrics in Spanish
Chorus

I 

II 

III 

IV

Lyrics in English
Chorus
In the book that keeps fame,
our name will have an heroic banner;
bravery, shall be our beautiful flag,
and the only shield will be the heart.

I 
Our weapons, for ever triumphant,
humiliated the fierce Spaniard,
from trumpet to the martial voices
that heard in its mountains the land of the sun.

II 
our people vibrated from courage
when enslaved our motherland cried,
how it roars, from yoke to rape,
with powerful rage proudly the lion.

III 
in the bloody field of Mars
freedom to the motherland was offered
by the immortal deed of Ricaurte,
that in Araguan land his Olimpus found.

IV 
Crowned with glory were our hills
when Ribas the sword brandished,
and in his Homeric pursuit Victory
with oppressing blood its fields sprayed.

See also
 List of anthems of Venezuela

Anthems of Venezuela
Spanish-language songs
Year of song missing